James Mason Hoppin (January 17, 1820 – November 15, 1906) was an American educator and writer.

Biography
James Mason Hoppin was born at Providence, Rhode Island on January 17, 1820. He graduated from Yale College in 1840 (where he was a member of Skull and Bones,) from Harvard Law School in 1842, and from Andover Theological Seminary in 1845. He studied for some time abroad; and was pastor of a Congregational church at Salem, Massachusetts from 1850 to 1859.  From 1861 to 1879 he was professor of homiletics at Yale, where he was also professor of art history from 1879 to 1899, when he became professor emeritus. He was a member of the Connecticut Academy of Arts and Sciences.

He died in New Haven, Connecticut on November 15, 1906.

Selected writings
 Old England: Its Art, Scenery, and People (1857)
 The Office and Work of the Christian Ministry (1869)
 Life of Rear-Admiral Andrew Hull Foote (1874)
 The Early Renaissance and Other Essays on Art Subjects (1892)
 Greek Art on Greek Soil (1897)
 The Reading of Shakespeare (1904)

References

External links
 

Yale University faculty
American religious writers
Harvard Law School alumni
Yale College alumni
American Christian clergy
19th-century Christian clergy
19th-century American non-fiction writers
Writers from Providence, Rhode Island
1820 births
1906 deaths
Burials at Grove Street Cemetery
20th-century American non-fiction writers
19th-century American male writers
20th-century American male writers
American male non-fiction writers
19th-century American clergy